The 2018–19 Indian cricket season was the 126th cricket season since the commencement of first-class cricket in India. The international cricket season started early in June 2018 with Afghanistan playing its home matches against Bangladesh. Afghanistan went on to win the T20I series 3–0. The Indian national team started its season hosting Afghanistan for the latter's Test cricket debut. India won the match in two days by an innings and 262 runs. West Indies toured India and lost the Test series 0–2, ODI series 1–3 and the T20I series 0–3.   Australia toured India and won the T20I series 2–0 and ODI series 3–2. India also played host to Afghanistan's home games against Ireland. Afghanistan won the T20I series 3–0 and Test series 1–0. The ODI series was drawn 2–2. England women's toured India and lost the WODI series 1–2 but won the WT20I series 3–0.

India was scheduled to host Asia Cup but it was moved to the United Arab Emirates, following ongoing political tensions between India and Pakistan. In July, the scheduled Asia Cup Qualifiers were also shifted from India to Malaysia. Zimbabwe was also scheduled to tour India but due to the conflicting dates with 2019 Indian Premier League, the Zimbabwe's tour was put in doubt and the series was postponed.

The A-team season consisted of tours from Australia A, South Africa A, England Lions and Australia A Women. South Africa A lost the first class series 0–1. They were joined by India B and Australia A for a List A Quadrangular Series. India B defeated Australia A in the final to win the series. Australia A drew the first class series 1–1. England Lions lost the first class series 0–1 and List A series 1–4. Australia A women won the women's list a series 0–3 but lost the women's T20 series 3–0.

The domestic season was the biggest ever after addition of nine new teams as per the Lodha Panel recommendations and overs 2000 matches were played. During the season, BCCI faced strain on its resources(umpires and referees) due to high number of matches. The domestic season began with Duleep trophy and finished in May with 12th season of Indian Premiere League. India Blue won the Duleep trophy. Bengal won the Vijay Hazare trophy. India C won the Deodhar trophy. Vidharbha won the Ranji Trophy. Vidharbha also won the Irani Trophy. Karnataka won the Syed Mushtaq Ali Trophy. Mumbai Indians won the 2019 Indian Premier League.

The women's domestic season began in August with the new Women's T20 Challenger Trophy and ended in May with Women's T20 Challenge. India Blue Women won the T20 Challenger Trophy. Bengal women won the one-day league. India Red Women won the One-Day Challenger Trophy. Punjab won the Senior Women's T20 League. IPL Supernovas won the 2019 Women's T20 Challenge.

International

India-A, India-B and India U-19 Teams

Domestic
The domestic season was the largest ever with addition of nine new teams as per the Lodha Panel recommendations and over 2000 matches were held. The nine new teams that will make their debut in the season are Arunachal Pradesh, Bihar, Manipur cricket team, Meghalaya, Mizoram, Nagaland, Puducherry, Sikkim and Uttarakhand. The new teams played in the plate group with old 28 teams playing in Elite Groups A, B and C. New teams also struggled for availability of grounds and players for the teams. The qualification structure, of top-5 teams qualifying from Group-A and B combined, was a source of confusion and controversy. The shortage of umpires and match officials also remained a serious issue for the BCCI. Cricket Association of Bengal complaint about the poor quality of umpires during Ranji Trophy. BCCI also had to face issue of players misusing their domicile to play for the new teams.

Men's

The men's season began in August with Duleep Trophy. India Blue defeated India Red by an innings and 187 runs in the final to win the tournament. The Vijay Hazare Trophy was played in September and October. Mumbai defeated Delhi in the final by 4 wickets to win the Vijay Hazare trophy. Deodhar Trophy was held in October. India C won the Deodhar Trophy by defeating India B by 29 runs in the final. The Ranji Trophy started in November and finished with knockouts being played in January. For the new teams in Plate group, the professional players played the key role of guiding and holding their teams during the Ranji trophy. Vidarbha successfully defended the Ranji Trophy crown by defeating Saurashtra by 78 runs in the final played at Nagpur. By winning the Ranji Trophy, Vidharbha played Rest of India in a Best vs Rest format one-off match for Irani Cup. Vidharbha defeated Rest of India on first-innings basis to win the Irani Cup. The Syed Mushtaq Ali Trophy was held in February and March. Karnataka won the Syed Mushtaq Ali Trophy for the first time after beating Maharashtra by 8 wickets in the final. The men's season ended with the 12th season of IPL, which ran from 23 March to 12 May. Mumbai Indians defeated Chennai Super Kings by 1 run in the final to win the 2019 Indian Premier League.

Women's

The Inter-zonal multi-day game was eliminated from the women's season. The Challenger Trophy was also held in T20 format along with previously played one-day format. The new T20 Challenger Trophy started the domestic season in August.India Blue Women defeated India Red women by 4 runs to win the inaugural trophy. The One-Day League was played in December. Due to scheduling conflicts, the knockout for the one-day tournament were delayed and moved from 24–29 December to 26–31 December. Bengal defeated Andhra by 10 runs in the final to win their first One Day League. One Day League was followed by One-Day Challenger Trophy in January. India Red defeated India Blue by 15 runs to win the Challenger Trophy for the 3rd time. T20 League was held in February. Punjab beat Karnataka by 4 runs to win the Senior Women T20 league. A parallel women's tournament with IPL, a followup to 2018 Women's T20 Challenge was held in May 2019 with three teams. IPL Supernovas defeated IPL Velocity by 4 wickets in the final to win the 2019 Women's T20 Challenge.

Junior level

International

Under-19 Men's International Quadrangular Series 2018

BCCI announced the Under-19 quadrangular tournament between Afghanistan, Nepal, India-A and NCA. NCA was later replaced by India-B while tournament was also shifted from Kolkata to Lucknow. The tournament was looked upon as a preparation for the Youth Asia Cup. The tournament was played from 12 to 18 September 2018. India U-19 B defeated India U-19 A by 10 runs in the final to win the tournament.

League

 Top two teams advanced to the final

Third place play-off

Final

Under-19 Men's Youth Test Series vs South Africa

In February and March 2019, South Africa Under-19 cricket team toured India to play 2-match Youth Test series against India Under-19 cricket team. Both the matches were played at the Greenfield International Stadium, Thiruvananthapuram. India Under-19 won the first test by 9 wickets. In 2nd test, India Under-19 defeated South Africa by an innings and 158 runs. Hence, India clean sweeped the Under-19 Youth Test series 2–0.

Under-19 Men's International Quadrangular Series 2019

BCCI announced the Under-19 quadrangular tournament between Afghanistan, Oman, India-A and India-B. Due to visa issues, Oman was later replaced by Afghanistan. The tournament was played from 5 to 11 March 2019 at Thiruvananthapuram. India U-19 B defeated India U-19 A by 72 runs in the final to win the tournament.

League

 Top two teams advanced to the final

Third place play-off

Final

Domestic Men's

Vijay Merchant Trophy was originally scheduled to start from 3 October but was postponed to 21 October after the request from state associations. Due to scheduling conflicts, the Cooch Behar trophy was also delayed. Vidarbha U-19 Men defeated Tamil Nadu U-19 Men by 83 runs in the final to win Vinoo Mankad Trophy. India Green Under-19 defeated India Blue Under-19 by 6 wickets in the final to win the Men's U19 One-Day Challenger Trophy. Haryana Under-16 defeated Jharkhand Under-16 on first-innings basis in the final to win the Vijay Merchant Trophy for the first time. Punjab Under-23 defeated Bengal Under-23 by 1 wicket in the final to win the Col C K Nayudu Trophy. Uttar Pradesh U-19 Men defeated Vidarbha U-19 Men on first-innings basis in the final to win the Cooch Behar Trophy. Vidarbha U-23 Men defeated Delhi U-23 Men by 4 wickets in the final to win the trophy. In the final tournament of the season, South Zone University Men defeated North Zone University Men by 60 runs to win the Vizzy Trophy.

Under-23
The Under-23 age group consisted of Col C K Nayudu Trophy(Multi-day competition) and One-Day League and Knockout.

Col C K Nayudu Trophy

Col C K Nayudu Trophy was played from 2 November 2018 to 7 February 2019. BCCI's move to allot women umpires for the tournament was appreciated. Shiva Singh's 360-degree action in a match was Bengal was a source of controversy leading to a clarification from MCC. Puducherry's Rex Singh took all 10 wickets in an innings in a league stage match against Manipur. Punjab Under-23 defeated Bengal Under-23 by 1 wicket in the final to win the tournament.

League
Points table

Elite Group-A

Elite Group-B

Elite Group-C

Plate

Knockout stage

Quarter-finals

Semi-finals

Final

Men's U23 One-Day League and Knockout

Men's U23 One-Day League and Knockout was played from 13 February to 15 March 2019. The tournament's qualification structure was similar to Ranji Trophy. Vidarbha U-23 Men defeated Delhi U-23 Men by 4 wickets in the final to win the trophy.

League
Points table

Elite Group-A and B

Elite Group-C

Plate

Knockout stage

Quarter-finals

Semi-finals

Final

Inter-University
Inter-University competition consisted of sole Vizzy Trophy tournament.

Vizzy Trophy

Vizzy Trophy was initially scheduled to be played in Knockout format from 20 to 23 March 2019. The tournament's format was changed to Round-Robin format which was followed by a final. It was played from 17 to 23 March 2019. South Zone University Men defeated North Zone University Men by 60 runs to win the tournament.

League

 Top two teams advanced to the final

Final

Under-19
The Under-19 age group consisted of Cooch Behar Trophy(Multi-day competition), Vinoo Mankad Trophy(One-day competition) and One-Day Challenger Trophy.

Cooch Behar Trophy

Cooch Behar Trophy was played from 19 November 2018 to 14 February 2019. The tournament's qualification structure was similar to Ranji Trophy. Uttar Pradesh U-19 Men defeated Vidarbha U-19 Men on first-innings basis in the final to win the trophy. Due to shortage of umpire and match officials, the third round of tournament was delayed from 17 to 20 December to 21 to 24 January and the knockouts were shifted from 29 January to 18 February. Manipur's Rex Singh took all 10 wickets in an innings in a league stage match against Arunachal Pradesh.

League
Points table

Elite Group-A and B

Elite Group-C

Plate

Knockout stage

Quarter-finals

Semi-finals

Final

Vinoo Mankad Trophy

Vinoo Mankad Trophy was played from 5 October to 4 November 2018. The tournament's qualification structure was similar to Ranji Trophy. Vidarbha U-19 Men defeated Tamil Nadu U-19 Men by 83 runs in the final to win their maiden trophy.

League
Points table

Elite Group-A and B

Elite Group-C

Plate

Knockout stage

Quarter-finals

Semi-finals

Final

Men's U19 One-Day Challenger Trophy

Men's U19 One-Day Challenger Trophy was played from 10 to 16 November 2018 at Lucknow. India Green Under-19 Men defeated India Blue Under-19 Men by 6 wickets in the final to win the tournament.

League

 Top two teams advanced to the final

Final

Under-16
The Under-16 age group solely consisted of Vijay Merchant Trophy(Multi-day competition).

Vijay Merchant Trophy

Vijay Merchant Trophy was played from 21 October 2018 to 15 January 2019. It remained the only tournament to be played at intrazonal basis at round-robin stage. The tournament was originally scheduled to start from 3 October but was postponed to 21 October after the request from state associations. Mumbai Under-16 team's captain Musheer Khan was banned for three years for misbehaviour towards his teammates. Haryana Under-16 defeated Jharkhand Under-16 on first-innings basis in the final to win the tournament for the first time.

League
Points table

North Zone

Central Zone

West Zone

East Zone

South Zone

North East and Bihar

Knockout stage

Pre-Quarter-finals

Quarter-finals

Semi-finals

Final

Domestic Women's

The Inter Zonal competition and Multi-Day Game format was eliminated from the season. The junior women's domestic season began in October with Women's U23 T20 Challenger Trophy. India Green Under-23 Women defeated India Blue Under-23 Women by 8 wickets to win the tournament. Uttar Pradesh U-23 Women defeated Andhra U-23 Women in the final by 18 runs to win the Women's U19 T20 League. India Red Under-19 Women defeated India Blue Under-19 Women by 10 runs to win the Women's U19 T20 Challenger Trophy. Railways U-23 Women defeated Maharashtra U-23 Women in the final by 3 wickets to win the Women's U23 T20 League. Bengal U-19 Women defeated Delhi U-19 Women by 26 runs (by VJD method) to win the Women's U19 One-Day League. Bengal U-23 Women defeated Mumbai U-23 Women by 2 runs to win the Women's U23 One-Day League. India Blue Under-23 Women defeated India Green Under-23 Women by 5 wickets to win the Women's U23 One-Day Challenger Trophy.

Under-23
The Under-23 age group consisted of One-Day League, One-Day Challenger Trophy, T20 League and T20 Challenger Trophy.

Women's U23 One-Day League

Women's U23 One-Day League was played from 17 March to 14 April 2019. The tournament's qualification structure was similar to Ranji Trophy. Bengal U-23 Women defeated Mumbai U-23 Women by 2 runs to win the tournament.

League
Points table

Elite Group-A and B

Elite Group-C

Plate

Knockout stage

Quarter-finals

Semi-finals

Final

Women's U23 One-Day Challenger Trophy

Women's U23 One-Day Challenger Trophy was played from 20 to 24 April 2019 at Ranchi. India Blue Under-23 Women defeated India Green Under-23 Women by 5 wickets in the final to win the tournament.

League

 Top two teams advanced to the final

Final

Women's U23 T20 League

Women's U23 T20 League was played from 14 January to 5 February 2019. Two teams each from 5 groups qualified for the 2-group Super League. Winners of the two groups met in the final. Railways U-23 Women defeated Maharashtra U-23 Women in the final by 3 wickets to win the tournament.

League
Points table

Group-A

Group-B

Group-C

Group-D

Group-E

Super League
Points table

Super Group-A

Super Group-B

Final

Women's U23 T20 Challenger Trophy

Women's U23 T20 Challenger Trophy was played from 4 to 8 October 2018 at Mysuru. India Green Under-23 Women defeated India Blue Under-23 Women by 8 wickets in the final to win the tournament.

League

 Top two teams advanced to the final

Final

Under-19
The Under-19 age group consisted of One-Day League, T20 League and T20 Challenger Trophy.

Women's U19 One-Day League

Women's U19 One-Day League was played from 10 February to 11 March 2019. The tournament's qualification structure was similar to Ranji Trophy. Bengal U-19 Women defeated Delhi U-19 Women by 26 runs (by VJD method) to win the tournament.

League
Points table

Elite Group-A and B

Elite Group-C

Plate

Knockout stage

Quarter-finals

Semi-finals

Final

Women's U19 T20 League

Women's U19 T20 League was played from 14 October to 3 November 2018. Two teams each from 5 groups qualified for the 2-group Super League. Winners of the two groups met in the final. Uttar Pradesh U-19 Women defeated Andhra U-19 Women in the final by 18 runs to win the tournament.

League
Points table

Group-A

Group-B

Group-C

Group-D

Group-E

Super League
Points table

Super Group-A

Super Group-B

Final

Women's U19 T20 Challenger Trophy

Women's U19 T20 Challenger Trophy was played from 12 to 16 November 2018 at Guntur, Andhra Pradesh. India Red Under-19 Women defeated India Blue Under-19 Women by 10 runs in the final to win the tournament.

League

 Top two teams advanced to the final

Final

References

Indian cricket seasons from 2000–01
2018 in Indian cricket
2019 in Indian cricket